Maxine Mackler Chesney (born October 29, 1942) is a senior United States district judge of the United States District Court for the Northern District of California.

Early life and education

Chesney was born on October 29, 1942 in San Francisco, California. She received a Bachelor of Arts degree from the University of California, Berkeley in 1964 and a Juris Doctor from the University of California, Berkeley, Boalt Hall School of Law in 1967. She was an attorney, Office of the San Francisco District Attorney, California from 1968 to 1979. She was a trial attorney from 1968 to 1969. She was a senior trial attorney from 1969 to 1971. She was a Principal trial attorney from 1971 to 1976. She was a Head trial attorney in 1976. She was an Assistant chief deputy from 1976 to 1979.

Judicial career

Municipal court judge
Chesney was a judge on the San Francisco Municipal Court, California from 1979 to 1983. She was a judge on the Superior Court of California, City and County of San Francisco, appointed and subsequently elected from 1983 to 1995.

Federal judicial service
In 1994, Chesney was nominated by President Bill Clinton to a seat on the United States District Court for the Northern District of California vacated by John P. Vukasin, Jr., but the United States Senate took no action on the nomination. However, President Clinton successfully resubmitted the nomination on January 24, 1995, and Chesney was confirmed by the Senate on May 8, 1995, receiving her commission on May 10, 1995. She took senior status on June 30, 2009.

Notes

References
  

California state court judges
District attorneys in California
1942 births
Living people
Judges of the United States District Court for the Northern District of California
United States district court judges appointed by Bill Clinton
UC Berkeley School of Law faculty
UC Berkeley School of Law alumni
Lawyers from San Francisco
American women legal scholars
American legal scholars
20th-century American judges
21st-century American judges
20th-century American women judges
21st-century American women judges